Roman Zambrowski (born Rubin Nassbaum; 15 July 1909 – 19 August 1977) was a Polish communist politician.

Career

Zambrowski was born into a  Jewish family in Warsaw. He was a member of the Communist Party of Poland (1928–1938) and of the Central Committee of the Young Communist League of Poland (1930–1938). During World War II in the Soviet Union, he was one of the main organisers and leaders of the Union of Polish Patriots (ZPP) from 1943 and of the Central Bureau Communists of Poland (CBKP) in 1944. He was the head of the Political and Educational Leadership of the First Polish Army (1944–1945).

From 1944, Zambrowski was a member and one of the leaders of the Polish Workers' Party (PPR) and then, from 1948 to 1968, of the Polish United Workers' Party (PZPR). He was in the PZPR's Central Committee (1948–1964) and held the office of the secretary of the Central Committee (1948–1954 and 1956–1963). He was in the PZPR's Politburo from 1948 to 1963. In 1956, he was a leader of the faction in the PZPR known as Puławianie. Zambrowski was a deputy in the State National Council (1944–1947) and then in the Sejm (1947–1965), where he was Deputy-marshal of the Sejm (1947–1952). In 1945–1954, he was the chairman of a special commission for combating economically harmful activities and misconduct; in 1963–1968 vice-president of the Supreme Audit Office (NIK).

Zambrowski was accused of inspiring the 1968 Polish political crisis and of Zionist affiliations; in 1968 he was expelled from the PZPR and removed from the vice-presidency of the NIK.

Later life and legacy

He is the father of journalist Antoni Zambrowski. Roman Zambrowski died in 2019.

A collection of Zambrowski's journals and other writings about Poland and Polska Zjednoczona Partia Robotnicza are held in the collection of the Hoover Institution.

See also 
 Puławianie
 1968 Polish political crisis
Leon Kasman

References

1909 births
1977 deaths
Politicians from Warsaw
People from Warsaw Governorate
Jews from the Russian Empire
Jewish Polish politicians
Communist Party of Poland politicians
Polish Workers' Party politicians
Members of the Politburo of the Polish United Workers' Party
Members of the State National Council
Members of the Polish Sejm 1947–1952
Members of the Polish Sejm 1952–1956
Members of the Polish Sejm 1957–1961
Members of the Polish Sejm 1961–1965
Jewish socialists
Polish People's Army personnel
Commanders with Star of the Order of Polonia Restituta
Burials at Powązki Military Cemetery